Ghulam Murtaza Malik (1941-2002) was an Islamic scholar who appeared on Pakistani & Saudi television. Seen as a "non-controversial, Sunni scholar linked to the Barelvi school of thought", he was assassinated in mysterious circumstances in 2002.

Personal life
Murtaza Malik was borne in 1941. He was a PhD Scholar in Islamic Philosophy & Metaphysics. He obtained two post-graduate degrees, including a master's degree in philosophy from Government College, Lahore and another master's degree in Arabic from University of the Punjab.

Professional Life
Ghulam Murtaza Malik was one of the most liberal Sunni Muslim scholars of Pakistan. He was a frequent commentator on religious matters. He had been teaching Quran and other Islamic studies at various educational institutions in Pakistan and in foreign countries. He had also been delivering lectures on the Pakistan Television, STN, Hum TV and other media forums. He was known for his enlightened views on Islam and his refusal to accept extremist interpretation of religion (as he was famous due to his non-controversial lectures as per Barelvi school of thought). He had never been involved in any sectarian matter, and indeed was known as a man who stood above such issues.

Assassination
Murtaza Malik (along with his driver) was shot dead by two gunmen at Allama Iqbal Town in May 2002. Dr Murtaza sustained a bullet in his jaw and the driver had two bullet holes in his back close to his neck. Unaware of the two killings, two policemen of the Tiger Squad on a patrol duty intercepted the gunmen some distance from the scene of the crime as the motorcycle did not have a number plate. The gunmen opened fire on the policemen and resultantly, one of the policemen died later on. As per details shared by Malik's family, he was on the way to look at a plot where he wanted to set up a religious institution. After two years, police arrested two suspects for killing Dr. Ghulam Murtaza Malik in 2004. Farooq and Arshad (both suspects) from Sunni Tehreek later on confessed many crimes including killing Dr Ghulam Murtaza Malik, Prof Attaur Rehman Saqib and his driver, Shia leader Syed Hassan Raza, and a constable named Maqbool Ahmed, Chaudhry Shafqaat Ahmed, senior superintendent of police (SSP). Both suspect told media that they were brainwashed.

Succession
Prof. Maimoona Murtaza Malik (being a daughter and successor of Dr. Ghulam Murtaza Malik) is a renowned female scholar, currently living in Riyadh, Saudi Arabia. She delivers lectures in Urdu language on variety of topics including Sirat al-Nabi, Adab-e-Dua, Tazkiya-e-Nafs etc. She covers topics related to the feminine community of the Islamic World like Women's Role in Islam. She helped her father to write many Islamic books (including Khutbat-e-Haram, Wajood-e-Bari Tala, Tauheed). She appears on many national and international channels including ARY Qtv.

Books
Research papers on socio-economic system of Islam, 1990.
Shāh Valīullāh kā falsafah : Mā baʻdult̤abīʻāt : ḥaqīqat-i kāʼināt, K̲h̲udā aur insān, 1990. On the philosophical thought of Shah Waliullah.
K̲h̲ut̤bāt-i Ḥaram : Ḥaram-i Madīnah, masjid-i Nabavī men̲ dars o taqārīr va dīgar ʻilmī maqālāt, 1990. Lectures and teachings about Islam.
Anvārulqurʻān : Qurʻān-i Karīm kī sūratoṇ kā taʻāruf o talk̲h̲īṣ, maz̤āmīn-i Qurʻān aur muntak̲h̲ab āyāt kī tafsīr, 1996. Subjectwise commentary on the verses of Koran.
Ikkīsvīn̲ ṣadī aur hamāre ʻulamāʼ, 1998.
Jihād fī sabīlillāh, qatāl, 2000. Lectures delivered on jihad according to Islamic teachings.

References

External links 
Staff Report, "Murtaza Malik’s killers arrested", Daily Times, 23 November 2004
"dr-murtaza-malik-cop-and-driver-shot-dead", Dawn News, 08 May 2002

20th-century Muslim scholars of Islam
Pakistani scholars
Pakistani Sunni Muslim scholars of Islam
Barelvis
2002 deaths
1941 births